Sarah Chauncey Woolsey (January 29, 1835 – April 9, 1905) was an American children's author who wrote under the pen name Susan Coolidge.

Background
Woolsey was born on January 29, 1835, into the wealthy, influential New England Dwight family, in Cleveland, Ohio.
Her father was John Mumford Woolsey (1796–1870) and her mother Jane Andrews, and author and poet Gamel Woolsey was her niece.
Her family moved to New Haven Connecticut in 1852.

Woolsey worked as a nurse during the American Civil War (1861–1865), after which she started to write. She never married, and resided at her family home in Newport, Rhode Island, until her death.  She edited The Autobiography and Correspondence of Mrs. Delaney (1879) and The Diary and Letters of Frances Burney (1880).

She is best known for her classic children's novel What Katy Did (1872). The fictional Carr family was modeled after her own, with Katy Carr inspired by Woolsey herself. The brothers and sisters were modeled on her four younger siblings: Jane Andrews Woolsey, born October 25, 1836, who married Reverend Henry Albert Yardley; Elizabeth Dwight Woolsey, born April 24, 1838, who married Daniel Coit Gilman and died in 1910; Theodora Walton Woolsey, born September 7, 1840; and William Walton Woolsey, born July 18, 1842, who married Catherine Buckingham Convers, daughter of Charles Cleveland Convers.

Works

Books

Katy Series
 1872: What Katy Did  or What Katy did at Home
 1873: What Katy Did at School
 1886: What Katy Did Next
 1888: Clover
 1890: In the High Valley
Single books
 1871: New-Year's Bargain, The [Tales.], edited by Louisa May Alcott
 1874: Mischief's Thanksgiving, and other stories
 1874: Little Miss Mischief, and other stories
 1875: Nine Little Goslings
 1875: Curly Locks
 1876: For Summer Afternoons [Tales.]
 1879: Eyebright A story
 1880: Verses,
 1880: A Guernsey lily or, How the feud was healed. A story for girls and boys.
 1881: Cross Patch, and other stories Adapted from the myths of Mother Goose
 1883: A Round Dozen, published by Roberts Brothers; B. J. Parkhill & Co., Printers, Boston, U.S.A.
 1884: Toinette and the Elves
 1885: A Little Country Girl
 1886: One day in a baby's life (adapted from the French book by M. Arnaud, Illustrations by Firmin Bouisset published by Roberts Brothers, Boston 1886. 31 pages)

 1887: Ballads of Romance and History
 1887: A Short History of the City of Philadelphia from its foundation to the present time
 1888: Cross Patch, and other stories Adapted from the myths of Mother Goose
 1889: A Few More Verses (verse)
 1889: Just Sixteen
 1890: The Day's Message Chosen and arranged by Susan Coolidge, Roberts Brothers, Boston
 1892: Rhymes and Ballads for Girls and Boys
 1893: The Barberry Bush (short stories)
 1894: Not Quite Eighteen
 1895: An Old Convent School In Paris
 1899: A little knight of labor
 1900: Little Tommy Tucker
 1900: Two Girls
 1901: Little Bo-Beep
 1902: Uncle and Aunt
 1904: The Rule of Three
 1906: Last Verses [With a biographical sketch of the author signed: E. D. W. G.]
 1906: A Sheaf of Stories ????: Twilight Stories (as Contributor),

Short stories, poems and other publications

published during her lifetime
 1869: The Funeral Flee, Hearth and Home illustrated weekly magazine, Vol 1, No 52, page 824, December 18, 1869
 1870: poetry in Scribner's Monthly, Vol. I, nos 1-6 Bound Nov 1870-Apr 1871 Scribners, 1870-1
 1871: Girls of the Far North, part 1;  The Little Corporal Magazine Vol. XII, No. 4, April 1871, Published by John E. Miller, Chicago
 Girls of the Far North, part 4;  The Little Corporal Magazine Vol. XIII, No. 1, July 1871, Published by John E. Miller, Chicago
 Edson's mother Scribners Illustrated Monthly, May to October 1871 p.296
 1872: Two Ways to Love (Poem), scriber's monthly an illustrated magazine for the people, conducted by J.G. Holland, October 1872; Vol. IV, No. 6
 In the Book, scriber's monthly, vol. 3, issue 5, page 567-572, 1872
 1873: the white flag (poem), Scribner's Monthly, May 1873 to October 1873, Volume 6
 A few hints on the california journey, Scribner's Monthly, May 1873 to October 1873, Volume 6
 1874: How St. Valentine Remembered Milly, (ss) St. Nicholas Magazine Feb 1874
 1875 Little One's Birthday - A Christmas story, Little Corporal Children's Magazine January 1875 Vol. XX, No. 1, Edited by Emily Huntingston Miller, published by John E. Miller, Chicago, 40 pages
 Blue and Pink (A Valentine Story), (ss) St. Nicholas Magazine Feb 1875
 Queen Blossom (A May-Day Story), (ss) St. Nicholas Magazine May 1875
 The Horse and the Wolf, (ss) St. Nicholas Magazine Jul 1875
 The Fortunes of a Saucer Pie, (vi) St. Nicholas Magazine Nov 1875
 The "Cradle Tomb" at Westminster, by Susan Coolidge (pp. 678-679), scriber's monthly an illustrated magazine for the people, conducted by J.G. Holland
 1876: Toinette and the Elves (A Christmas Story), (ss) St. Nicholas Magazine Jan 1876
 The Two Goats, St. Nicholas cribner's Illustrated Magazine for Girls and Boys conducted by Mary Mapes Dodge
 The Little Maid of Domremy, (bg) St. Nicholas Magazine Jun 1876
 Ready for Europe, (nF) St. Nicholas Magazine May 1876
 How the Storks Came and Went, (ss) St. Nicholas Magazine Jul 1876
 At Fiesole, (ss) St. Nicholas Magazine Oct 1876
 A Queen, and Not a Queen, (bg) St. Nicholas Magazine Nov 1876
 The Secret Door (A Christmas Story of Two Hundred Years Ago), (ss) St. Nicholas Magazine Dec 1876 (also published in The Golden Pathway Circ.
 1877: The Two Wishes: A Fairy Story, (ss) St. Nicholas Magazine Mar 1877
 Illustrated Texts, (nF) St. Nicholas Magazine Apr 1877
 The Mother in the Desert, (vi) St. Nicholas Magazine Jun 1877
 Mrs. June's Prospectus, Young Folks' Readings, for Social and Public Entertainment. Edited by Lewis B. Monroe. Boston: Lee and Shepard, Publishers. New York: Charles T. Dillingham
 1878: Solimin: A Ship of the Desert, (vi) St. Nicholas Magazine Feb 1878
 The Fox and the Turkeys; or Charley and the Old Folks, (vi) St. Nicholas Magazine Sep 1878
 1879: The Old Stone Basin, (pm) St. Nicholas Magazine Jan 1879
 Mignonette, (pm) St. Nicholas Magazine Jun 1879
 Eyebright, (sl) St. Nicholas Magazine Feb, Mar, Apr, May, Jun, Jul, Aug, Sept(chapter 10), Oct 1879
 Autobiography and Correspondence of Mrs. Delany, revised from Lady Llanover's Edition and Edited by Sarah Chauncey Woolsey, Roberts Brothers, Boston
 1880: The Boy and the Giant, (vi) St. Nicholas Magazine May 1880
 The Fox and the Stork, (ss) St. Nicholas Magazine Aug 1880
 KintuAtlantic Monthly July to December 1880, p 179
 Interpreted (Poem), The Atlantic Monthly, A Magazine of Literature, Science, Art and Politics Volume XLV December 1879 - June 1880
 1881: In the Tower- AD 1554, (pm) St. Nicholas Magazine Feb 1881
 The Mastiff and His Master, (vi) St. Nicholas Magazine Jun 1881
 The Isle of Peace, by Susan Coolidge (pp. 481-498), scriber's monthly an illustrated magazine for the people, conducted by J.G. Holland
 1882: Concord, Atlantic Monthly magazine from July 1882
 Golden-Rod, Purple and Gold, Arranged by Kate Sanborn, Illustrated by Rosina Emmet: Boston, James R. Osgood and Company
 Cross Patch pp. 474, The Century Illustrated monthly magazine. November 1881 to April 1882, Vol. XXIII, New Series Vol. I, THE CENTURY CO., NY
 New Every Morning in "Golden Thoughts on Mother, Home, and Heaven from Poetic and Prose Literature of all Ages and All Lands." E.B. Treat, New York
 1884: Lydia Maria Child in Our famous women, Comprising the Lives and Deeds of American Women," by Several Authors, A.D. Worthington and Company 1884
 Reply, The Century - Illustrated Monthly Magazine May to October 1884, p. 744
 When (poem), pp. 249 ,Illustrated Home Book of Poetry and Song, Caxton Publishing Co., Chicago
 1885: Uncle and Aunt, illustrated by Jessie Curtis Shepherd, St. Nicholas Magazine Nov 1885
 "Who ate the sweetmeat" Christmas hearth library, Boston, D. Lothrop and Company
 The Little Christmas Tree, (pm) St. Nicholas Magazine Dec 1885
 1886: The Secret of It, (pm) St. Nicholas Magazine Jan 1886
 A Dainty Little Trencherman "The Household" Magazine, Devoted to the interests of the American housewife 1886

 1887: Lohengrin,SCRIBNER'S MAGAZINE May 1887 - Volume I, pp. 614–615
 In her garden SCRIBNER'S MAGAZINE November 1887 - Volume II, No. 5
 Little Alix: a story of the children's Crusade Ballads Of Romance And History. 111 pages, illustrated. Boston D. Lothrop 1887.
 A year, verse, Ladies' World New York September 1887 Vol VIII No 9
 Little Alix: A Story Of The Children's Crusade, Ballads of Romance and History, Boston, D. Lothrop Company 1887
 1888: Charlotte Bronte, (pm) St. Nicholas Magazine Dec 1888
 Christmas Day, young people's new pictorial library of poetry and prose, published by the Northwestern Publishing Co. in 1888
 A Convent School of the Last Century, Atlantic 1888 p. 779
 1889: A Coming Out illustrated by Graves, Ladies Home Journal Sep 1889
 A Little Knight of Labor, Chapter II, with illustration by Edmund H. Garrett, WIDE AWAKE An Illustrated Magazine October 1889, Volume 29  Number 5, (Editors: Charles Stuart Pratt & Ella Farman Pratt, Publishers: D. Lothrop Company, Boston, U. S. A.)
 Snowy Peter, Story-Time for 1890, by Various Authors, D. Lothrop Company Publishers, Boston, 1889
 1890: Hour of Comfort, Poem, The Illustrated Christian Weekly, November 29, 1890, Vol XX No 48
 1891: Poems in Guests Of The Heart, Edited By A. Craig. Augusta, Maine: E. C. Allen 1891
 1892: How Bunny Brought Good Luck (Bunny is a doll, whose loss leads to the discovery of a lost silver mine). Illustrated by Walter Bobbett. St. Nicholas - An Illustrated Magazine For Young Folks. Volume XX. Part 1 November 1892 - April 1893
 1893: The Wolves of St. Gervas, Famous Stories and Poems edited by D. Lothrop Company, Boston
 A Good Bad Horse, Famous Stories and Poems edited by D. Lothrop Company, Boston
 a heroic poem, Wide Awake Illustrated Magazine, June 1893, D. Lothrop Company
 Angels is as Angels Does, 52 Other Stories for Girls, edited by Alfred Henry Miles, published by Hutchinson & Co., London
 1894: title unknown, R. Tuck Year book 12, 1894
 1897: Little Ursel's Mothering Sunday illustraded by Edmund Garrett, The deacon's little maid and other poems of childhood, Lothrop Publishing
Co., Boston
 1898: Newport Historic Towns of New England Edited by Lyman P. Powell Illustrated with photos, drawings, and maps, New York.  G.P. Putnam's Sons.  1898.
 1899: The Better Way, Poem at head of THE INDIAN HELPER, November 3, 1899
 1900: Queen Log And Queen Stork (Illustrated by C. M. Relyea),St. Nicholas Magazine for Youth May to October-1900, page 859
 1901: Thoughts by Susan Coolidge in Thoughts edited by Jessie K Freeman Sarah S. B. Yule, Dodge publishing company, NY, 1901
 1902: Paradise, Young Folks' Library in Twenty Volumes. Volume VII: School and College Days. Edited by Kirk Munroe and Mary Hartwell Catherwood
 unknown poem, The Wedding Day Book with the Congratulations of the Poets arranged by Katharine Lee Bates and published by Lothrop Publishing Company, Boston, 429-pages.
 1903: Dr. Johnson and Hodge His Cat, United Presbyterian Youth Evangelist Paper, No. 28, July 12, 1903
 unknown title, The Posy Ring A Book of Verse for Children, Chosen and Classified by Kate Douglas Wiggin and Nora Archibald Smith. Published by Doubleday, Page & Co
 1904: A group of New England dishes furnished by Susan Coolidge, Mary Ronald's CENTURY COOK BOOK 1897 + New York 1904unknown title, Little Lassies, Grosset & Dunlap 1904
 The Desert Island I and II, published in The Jones Third Reader edited by L. H. Jones, Ginn & Company, Boston, USA 1904
 1905: Susie's Letter About Chipmonks, Twilight Stories published by Saalfild publishing Co
 undated: God rules the year, A new year's message of love, printed in Berlin, Germany.
 12 stories of heroism, Magna Charta Stories. World-Famous Struggles for Freedom in Former Times. Recounted for Youthful Readers Edited by Arthur Gilman, A.M. Published by Blackie and Son Limited

published after her death
 1907: How the Leaves Came Down, Ladies' Home Journal magazine - November 1907, VOLUME XXIV, EDITION 12
 1908: How the Leaves Came Down, A Treasury of Verse for Little Children selected by M.G. Edgar Illustrated by Willy Pogany, Published by George G. Harrap & Co., London also in The Wooster Third Reader by Lorraine Elizabeth Wooster, M.A. Published by Wooster & Company - Chicago, Illinois 1915
 1909: In April, (pm) The All-Story Magazine Apr 1909
 Ramona by Helen Hunt Jackson. Introduction by Susan Coolidge 1909
 A 4 line verse (THANK God for death : bright thing / with dreary name, / We wrong with mournful flowers her / pure, still brow) in  A LITTLE BOOK OF COMFORT, Compiled by Rev. Albert E Sims; THE CHOICE BOOKS LONDON:  GEORGE G HARRAP & CO LTD; THE RIVERSIDE PRESS LIMITED, EDINBURGH, GREAT BRITAIN
 How the Leaves Came Down	(poem), p85, The Ontario Readers Second Book, authorized by the Minister of Education
 1920: The Secret Door, The treasure chest of my bookhouse, Edited by Olive Beaupre Miller, Chicago, The BOOKHOUSE for CHILDREN, Publishers 1920, 448 pages
 1928: Beginning again, Woman's World September 1928
 1930 section IV Romance and Reality / My book house the treasure chest 1928)
 1934: Toinette and the Elves- Christmas, a book of stories ald and new, Selected by Alice Dalgliesh, Illustrated by Hildegard Woodward, published by Charles Scribner, New York
 Imogen Comes to Tea, The golden wonder book for children by John R. Crossland & J.M. Parrish, Published by Odhams press LTD 1934
 1935: Cousin Helen's Visit, The Mammoth Wonder Book edited by John Crossland & J.M. Parrish, London: Odhams Press 1935
 1937: Christmas boxes, The children's golden treasure book by Odhams Press ltd
 1???: How the Leaves Came Down, Poem in The Home Book of Verse by Burton Stevenson
 18??: New Every Morning Poem ("Every day is a fresh beginning! / Listen, my soul, to the glad refrain,/ And spite of old sorrow and older sinning / And puzzles forecast and possible pain, / Take heart with the day, and begin again.")
 1980: Kikeri, published in The Illustrated Treasury of Humor for Children edited by Judith Hendra, Grosset and Dunlap Publishers New York
 1991: Roses and thorns in School Stories 

Translations

German
 Wenn morgen heute ist..., Erich Schmidt Verlag, 1956 = What Katy DidFinnish
 Katyn toimet = What Katy Did Katy koulussa = What Katy Did at School Katyn myöhemmät toimet = What Katy Did Next Clover = Clover Alppilaakson maja = In the High WalleyNorwegian
 Katy, den eldste av seks = What Katy Did Katy på skolen = What Katy Did at School Hva Katy gjorde siden = What Katy Did Next Katy på reise Katy hjemme Clara, Katys søster = Clover Øientrøst : fortælling Høiendal = In the High WalleyRussian
 Что Кейти делала = What Katy Did Что Кейти делала в школе = What Katy Did at School Что Кейти делала потом = What Katy Did NextSwedish
 Katy i hemmet = What Katy Did Katy i skolan = What Katy Did at School Vad Katy gjorde sedan = What Katy Did Next Clover : Berättelse för flickor. = CloverItalian
 Cio che fece Katy = What Katy DidSpanish
 Las cosas de Katy = What Katy DidPortuguese
 O que Katy fez = What Katy Did O que Katy fez a seguir = What Katy Did Next Os sonhos de KatyDanish
 Katy, den ældste af seks = What Katy Did Katy-bøkerne I Fiesole Den hemmelige Dør''

Articles on Susan Coolidge
1959: Susan Coolidge, the Horn Book Magazine of books and reading for children and young people. 14 pages in June 1959

Notes

External links

 
 
 
 
 Works by Susan Coolidge (Sarah Chauncey Woolsey) at The Online Books Page
 19th-Century Girls' Series
 German Database to search for translations
 

1835 births
1905 deaths
American children's writers
19th-century American women writers
American Civil War nurses
American women nurses
People from Newport, Rhode Island
Woolsey family